Luck is the third studio album by artist Tom Vek, released on 9 June 2014. The first single "Sherman (Animals in the Jungle)" was released on 11 April 2014.

Track listing

Critical reception 

Luck received generally favourable reviews from critics.
On Metacritic, which assigns a "weighted average" rating out of 100 from selected independent ratings and reviews from mainstream critics, the album received a Metascore of 72 based on 14 reviews.

Sofie Jenkinson from The Line of Best Fit called the album, "the vehicle for one of the most unusual and malleable voices in Britain today." and gave the album a score of 85/100.

References 

2014 albums
Tom Vek albums